Lieutenant-Colonel Sidney Hands TD (3 June 1903 – 23 November 1991) was a British philatelist and president of the Royal Philatelic Society London 1973–75. Hands was a specialist in the philately of Bolivia.

References 

British philatelists
Presidents of the Royal Philatelic Society London
People educated at the Royal Grammar School, High Wycombe
British Army officers
British Army personnel of World War II
1903 births
1991 deaths
Philately of Bolivia